Johnny and the Hurricanes were an American instrumental rock band from Toledo, Ohio, United States. They specialized in adapting popular traditional melodies into the rock idiom, using organ and saxophone as their featured instruments.  Between 1958 and 1963, the group had a number of hits in both the US and the UK, and the band developed a following in Europe. In 1962, they played at the Star-Club in Hamburg, where the Beatles, then a little-known band, served as an opening act.  The band continued as a live act through 2005; leader Johnny Paris died in 2006.

Career
They began as the Orbits in Toledo in 1957. Led by saxophonist Johnny Paris (born August 29, 1940, as John Matthew Pocisk, Walbridge, Ohio, died May 1, 2006, Ann Arbor, Michigan), they were school friends who played on a few recordings behind Mack Vickery, a local rockabilly singer. They signed with Harry Balk and Irving Micahnik of Twirl Records, which led to national engagements in 1958; at this point, they were renamed as Johnny and the Hurricanes. They then recorded "Crossfire", in a vacant cinema (the Carmen Theater on Schaefer Road in Dearborn, Michigan) to provide echo. It became a nationwide U.S. hit, and reached No. 23 on the US chart in the spring of 1959.  

They followed with "Red River Rock", an instrumental version of "Red River Valley", on Warwick Records. It became a top ten hit on both sides of the Atlantic (No. 5 in the U.S., No. 3 in the UK), and sold over a million copies. The musicians in the band then were Paris on saxophone, Paul Tesluk (July 2, 1940 – August 20, 2022) on a Hammond Chord organ, Dave Yorko on guitar, Lionel "Butch" Mattice (February 19, 1939 – October 16, 2006) on bass, and Bill "Little Bo" Savich on drums.

They specialised in versions of old tunes with a rock and roll beat. They chose these songs because they were well recognized and easier to accept with the beat.  Tunes were credited to 'King, Mack' and usually one other name: King and Mack were in fact pseudonyms for Harry Balk and Irving Micahnik, the band's managers. In 1960, they recorded the United States Army bugle call, "Reveille", as "Reveille Rock", and turned "Blue Tail Fly" into "Beatnik Fly". Both tunes made the Top 40 achieving number 25 and 15 respectively. The band also recorded "Down Yonder" for Big Top Records. In the same year, they recorded "When The Saints Go Marching In" as "Revival", but it ranked in the charts for just one week, peaking at No. 97. The record was flipped over in the UK, where "Rocking Goose" reached No. 3 in the UK Singles Chart.

The band developed a following in Europe. In 1962, they played at the Star-Club in Hamburg, where the Beatles, then a little-known band, served as an opening act. Johnny and the Hurricanes cut records until 1987, with "Old Smokie" (their cover of "On Top of Old Smokey"), and an original tune, "Traffic Jam", both on Big Top Records, being their last releases to chart in America.  Johnny Paris, the only constant member of the band, continued to tour with his Hurricanes in Europe and the United States until his death. He had an uncle, a realtor, in Rossford, Ohio, Johnny's home town, who owned a building on the main street and offered Johnny's first wife, Sharon Venier-Pocisk, space for an antique shop. When not on the road he helped out with the antique shop and vending machine business as payment for the store front for his first wife.

Johnny Paris and his band toured Europe occasionally until the end of 2005. He died on May 1, 2006, at the University Clinic of Ann Arbor, Michigan, of hospital-borne infections after an operation. Paris's second wife and widow, the German journalist, novelist, and vocalist Sonja Verena (Reuter) Paris, took over his business (Atila Records, Sirius 1 Music, and Johnny and the Hurricanes Incorporated) and the rights to his songs and trademarks.  Paris said that over 300 musicians played in the band in its fifty-year existence.

The band inspired the song "Johnny and the Hurricanes" on the album How I Learned to Love the Bootboys, by the band the Auteurs. They were also namechecked in the Kinks' 1973 song "One of the Survivors", and in "Bridge in Time" on the 1990 Burton Cummings album Plus Signs.

Deaths 
Johnny Paris died on May 1, 2006, aged 65.  Drummer Bill "Little Bo" Savich died on January 4, 2002, aged 61.  Bassist Lionel "Butch" Mattice died on October 16, 2006, aged 67.  Guitarist David Yorko died on February 17, 2017, at the age of 73.  Keyboard player Paul Tesluk died on August 20, 2022, at the age of 82.

Discography 

Johnny and the Hurricanes (1959)
Stormsville (1960)
The Big Sound of Johnny and the Hurricanes (1960)

References

External links
History of Rock:- Johnny and the Hurricanes
The Independent Online "Johnny Paris obituary"
Former Johnny and the Hurricanes
The Beatles bragged about working with Johnny and the Hurricanes.

Rock music groups from Ohio
American instrumental musical groups
Rock and roll music groups